Mark Cohen may refer to:

Mark Cohen (photographer) (born 1943), American street photographer
Mark Cohen (Rent), fictional character
Mark Cohen (cricketer) (born 1961), former Irish cricketer
Mark Cohen (comedian), American comedian
Mark Cohen (journalist) (1849–1928), New Zealand journalist, newspaper editor, educationalist and social reformer
Mark Cohen (American footballer) (born 1970), British-American football player
Mark B. Cohen (born 1949), Philadelphia judge and Pennsylvania State Representative
Mark Howard Cohen (born 1955), Georgia attorney and United States District Judge
Mark J. Cohen (1942–1999), American realtor, and collector of comic books and comic art, and cartoonists' agent and comic art dealer
Mark Cohen (surgeon), Canadian laser eye surgeon
Mark Nathan Cohen, American anthropologist
Mark R. Cohen (born 1943), American professor of Near Eastern Studies
Mark S. Cohen (born 1956), American neuroscientist

See also
Marc Cohen, American radio presenter
Marc Cohn (born 1959), American singer-songwriter
Mark Cohon (born 1966), Canadian Football League commissioner